Philip Nicholas Seton Mansergh  (27 June 1910 – 16 January 1991) was a historian. His focus was on Ireland and the British Commonwealth.  As the Smuts Professor of Commonwealth History at Cambridge University after 1953, he trained many of the specialists in the field of Irish, Indian, and Commonwealth studies. He played the central role in assembling and editing the "monumental" 12-volume edition of historical documents associated with the independence of India.

Early life and education
Nicholas Mansergh was born at Greenane House, Tipperary, Ireland.  He maintained lifelong ties there.  He was the second son of Philip St George Mansergh (1863–1928), a railway engineer, and Ethel Marguerite Otway Louise Mansergh (1876–1963). One of his earliest memories was of trains leaving the town carrying soldiers destined for service on the Western Front in the First World War. After a short period at school in the north, Mansergh attended the Erasmus Smith (Abbey) School in Templemore in his native Tipperary, which was founded in 1760. He was the youngest boy there when the school suddenly closed in 1922; he also attended The Abbey School, Tipperary. After the Irish Civil War, Mansergh attended St. Columba's College, Dublin with his elder brother, then he went up to Pembroke College, Oxford to read modern history. There he came under the influence of R. B. McCallum and was later supervised by W. G. S. Adams.

Career
After graduation, Mansergh was a tutor in the school of Modern Greats at the University of Oxford and secretary to the Oxford Union Politics Research Committee. His first book, The Irish Free State: Its Government and Politics (1934), fuelled his subsequent interest in the Commonwealth, one that he would pursue for the remainder of his academic career. In an interview a half century later, Mansergh noted:
The Commonwealth for my generation had something in common with the Common Market nowadays. I was interested in the Commonwealth to see if it would provide a way forward in Ireland itself. An inherent weakness in the Anglo-Irish Treaty was that the Dominion settlement was not consistent with Partition [from Northern Ireland].  I felt that Dominion status wouldn't work, which was obvious enough by 1934, but I wasn't sure whether any alternative to Dominion status would work in Ireland's case.
Mansergh followed this up in 1940 with Ireland in the Age of Reform and Revolution, which critically analysed the Marxist dialectic as it had been applied to Ireland, noting later that this led to his frequent misidentification as a Marxist historian. During the Second World War, Mansergh worked in the British Ministry of Information, where after working on Anglo-Irish information services and cultural relations he was appointed head of the Empire division in 1944. He was made an Officer of the Order of the British Empire in the 1946 New Year Honours.

After the war, Mansergh was elected to the chair of British Commonwealth relations at Chatham House. He also began visiting India as an observer at the Asian Relations Conference. Upon his return, Mansergh gave a lecture on "The Implications of Éire's Relations with the British Commonwealth of Nations", which helped influence Commonwealth relations during the late 1940s.

In 1953 Mansergh was appointed to the newly created position of Smuts Professor of the History of the British Commonwealth at Cambridge University. There he supervised several research students studying Irish history and he ran a special subject on the Anglo-Irish settlement which was taken by numerous students reading for Part II of the Historical Tripos. W. K. Hancock states:
"In the departments of history in nearly every British university Ireland had remained for too long a forgotten country, except as an irritating intruder into British party politics. Cambridge had been in some degree an exception to that bad rule.. But Mansergh was the first member of the faculty to make specific provisions for the teaching of Irish history both to undergraduates and graduates.... For as far ahead as anybody can foresee, Mansergh's contribution to Irish historiography will remain an enlightening  and civilized influence upon intelligent teachers, students and men of affairs both in Ireland and in Britain."

In 1967 he was appointed editor-in-chief by the prime minister, Harold Wilson, of a multi-volume collection of documents from the India Office on the transfer of power to India in the 1940s. Two years later, he published one of his most important works, The Commonwealth Experience, and was elected Master of St John's College, Cambridge. In 1971 he was made an honorary fellow of Trinity College Dublin. He served as Master until 1979, and continued there afterwards as a fellow, and he was also three times Visiting Professor at the Indian School of International Studies in New Delhi.

Historian Margaret O'Callaghan said "Nicholas Mansergh...was one of the finest historians of high political relations between successive British governments and those of the two parts of the island of Ireland."  He was a member of the British Academy, where the obituary by David Harkness praised his distinguished work.  A festschrift from his students honoured his memory.

Personal life
In December 1939 at St. Mary the Virgin Church, Oxford University, Nicholas Mansergh married Diana Mary Keeton (1919–2001), the daughter of George Keeton of Fleet, Hampshire, an English public school headmaster and former England Rugby international. Diana Keeton had studied languages at Lady Margaret Hall, Oxford and was a women's squash and lawn tennis blue. Nicholas Mansergh was himself a former Irish senior men's tennis champion and met Keeton on an Oxford tennis court. She later edited two collections of his papers after her husband's death in 1991. She died in 2001. They had 5 children (Philip, Daphne, Martin, Nicholas and Jane). Martin is a former Irish politician and historian.

Legacy
A travel bursary at St. Columba's, his old school, was donated by him.

Published works

 (reissued as The Irish Question, 1840–1921, 1965, 1975 )

Documents and Speeches on Commonwealth Affairs, 1952–1962  (1963) 804pp online
 (revised 1982)
 (12 volumes)
 Mansergh, Nicholas, and E. W. R. Lumby, eds.  India: The Transfer of Power 1942-7. Vol. II. 'Quit India' 30 April-21 September 1942 (London: Her Majesty's Stationery Office, 1971), 1044pp online Volumes are available from the Internet Archive

Tributes
St John's College awards an annual Mansergh Prize in his honour to the best short dissertation or essay (under 10,000 words) on history.

References

Further reading
 Hancock, W.K. "Nicholas Mansergh: Some Recollections and Reflections," in Norman Hillmer and Philip G. Wigley, eds. The First British Commonwealth: Essays in Honour of Nicholas Mansergh (Routledge, 1980)  pp 3–9.
  Harkness, David. "Philip Nicholas Seton Mansergh (1910-1991)" Proceedings of the British Academy (1993), Vol. 79, pp 415–430, obituary and tribute to his work
 Hyam, R. "Mansergh, (Philip) Nicholas Seton (1910–1991)" Oxford Dictionary of National Biography (2004)
 McGrath, Tom. "The Saturday Interview" , The Irish Times, June 11, 1983.  Interview with Mansergh.
 O'Callaghan, Margaret. "Anglo-Irish Relations" Twentieth Century British History 4#1 (1993), pp 86–90.

1910 births
1991 deaths
Irish Anglicans
People from County Tipperary
Alumni of Pembroke College, Oxford
Fellows of Pembroke College, Oxford
Fellows of St John's College, Cambridge
Honorary Fellows of Trinity College Dublin
Masters of St John's College, Cambridge
Irish non-fiction writers
Irish male non-fiction writers
Officers of the Order of the British Empire
20th-century Irish historians
People educated at The Abbey School (Tipperary)
Smuts Professors of Commonwealth History